Extendedance Play (stylized as ExtendedancEPlay) is a studio 12" EP by British rock band Dire Straits, released on 14 January 1983 by Vertigo Records internationally, and by Warner Bros. Records in the United States. The record contains three tracks on the international version and four on the U.S. version, which also included the song "Badges, Posters, Stickers, T-Shirts," an outtake from the Love over Gold sessions. The cassette release of the EP is called Twisting by the Pool, after the hit song of the same name on its first track.

The EP consists of upbeat tracks with a rock and roll, jazz and swing feel. It is the first release by the band to feature drummer Terry Williams, who filled the spot after drummer Pick Withers left the group in November 1982.

This EP has never been released on compact disc; however, the song "Twisting by the Pool" appears on the compilation Sultans of Swing: The Very Best of Dire Straits and a live version of "Two Young Lovers" is featured on Alchemy: Dire Straits Live. A very rare CD-Video release exists, however.

Track listing
All songs were written by Mark Knopfler.

Personnel
Dire Straits
 Mark Knopfler – vocals, lead guitar
 Hal Lindes – rhythm guitar, backing vocals
 Alan Clark – piano, Hammond organ, synthesizer
 John Illsley – bass, backing vocals
 Terry Williams – drums (1, 3, 4)
 Pick Withers – drums (2)

Additional personnel
 Mel Collins – saxophone (3)

Production
 Mark Knopfler – producer
 John Etchells – engineer

Charts

References
Notes

Citations

Dire Straits albums
1983 debut EPs
Albums produced by Mark Knopfler
Vertigo Records EPs
Warner Records EPs